The Cabinet was a professional wrestling stable that was part of World Wrestling Entertainment's (WWE) SmackDown! brand. It was created by John "Bradshaw" Layfield (JBL) shortly after he won the WWE Championship at The Great American Bash in 2004.

The future of the Cabinet seemed to be in doubt in mid-2005 after the firing of Amy Weber and the resignation of the Basham Brothers (who were then split in the WWE draft lottery). The stable had dwindled down to just JBL and Orlando Jordan. With both men seemingly concentrating on their own singles careers, it seemed like the end of the Cabinet, but on the September 16, 2005 edition of SmackDown!, after JBL lost to Rey Mysterio, he hired spin doctor Jillian Hall in order to fix his career. Though seemingly adding a publicist to the stable, there was no mention of the Cabinet until December 9, 2005, when Jordan assisted JBL in a match. This led to General manager Theodore Long announcing that  JBL and Jordan would team up for a match at the end of the night.

The return of the Cabinet was later fueled when Hall accompanied Jordan to the ring for a match taped for Velocity on December 16. Hall was fired by JBL, Jordan was released from WWE, and JBL retired from (and subsequently returned to) professional wrestling, but has then retired fully. Today, Layfield is the only member of the stable employed by the WWE.

Members 
The group was organized like a presidential cabinet. The trademark of the group was the "Longhorn" pose, where each member raised their arms at an angle and positioned their hands flat resembling JBL's Texas longhorn symbol.

 President/Leader – John "Bradshaw" Layfield.
 Image Consultant – Amy Weber; left WWE, but was fired on-screen (kayfabe) by JBL.
 Co-Secretaries of Defense – The Basham Brothers (Doug and Danny Basham); quit on the June 16, 2005 episode of SmackDown!.
 Chief of Staff – Orlando Jordan; quietly stopped appearing with JBL after losing the United States Championship.
 Publicist/Fixer – Jillian Hall; fired.

Titles 
John "Bradshaw" Layfield won the WWE Championship at The Great American Bash, and kept it until WrestleMania 21. During this time, he set up The Cabinet. This reign lasted nine months, and consequently JBL was the longest-reigning WWE Champion of the decade, a reign which was broken by John Cena. JBL defeated many established main event stars during his reign, including Eddie Guerrero, The Undertaker, Booker T, and Big Show.

Orlando Jordan won the United States Championship, after picking up a controversial win over former champion John Cena on March 3, 2005. This was his first title reign of any kind since his debut. Jordan and JBL later destroyed Cena's "Spinner" belt.

While Co-Secretaries of Defense, the Basham Brothers picked up their second reign as WWE Tag Team Champions on the January 13 edition of SmackDown, when they eliminated Rob Van Dam and Rey Mysterio in a fatal four-way elimination match that also included the teams of Mark Jindrak and Luther Reigns, and Booker T and Eddie Guerrero.

For a short time, the group had dominated all the male-based championships in the SmackDown! brand.

Championships and accomplishments 
 Pro Wrestling Illustrated
 PWI ranked John "Bradshaw" Layfield No. 5 of the 500 best singles wrestlers in the PWI 500 in 2005
 World Wrestling Entertainment
 WWE Championship (1 time) – John "Bradshaw" Layfield
 WWE United States Championship (1 time) – Orlando Jordan (1)
 WWE Tag Team Championship (1 time) – The Basham Brothers
 Wrestling Observer Newsletter
 Best Gimmick (2004) – John "Bradshaw" Layfield

References 

Cabinet, The